Kirana may refer to:

 Kirana Hills, Pakistan
 Kirana-I, a series of 24 cold-tests conducted by Pakistan during 1983–1990 in the Kirana Hills
 Kirana Bar, a hilly area named after the Kirana Hills
 Kirana store, a small neighborhood retail store in the Indian Subcontinent
 Kirana Ti, a Star Wars character
 Alternative romananization of the Indic word Kiran
 Astro Kirana, a Singapore satellite television channel